Rohillas are an Indian community of Pashtun ancestry, historically found in Rohilkhand, a region in the state of Uttar Pradesh, India. It forms the largest Pashtun diaspora community in India, and has given its name to the Rohilkhand region. The Rohilla military chiefs settled in this region of northern India in the 1720s, the first of whom was Daud Khan.

The Rohillas are found all over Uttar Pradesh, but are more concentrated in the Rohilkhand regions of Bareilly and Moradabad divisions. Between 1838 and 1916, some Rohillas migrated to Guyana, Suriname and Trinidad and Tobago in the Caribbean region of the Americas in which they form a subset of the Muslim minority of the Indo-Caribbean ethnic group. After the 1947 Partition of India, many of the Rohillas migrated to Karachi, Pakistan as a part of the Muhajir community.

Origin 
The term Rohilla first became common in the 17th century. Rohilla was used to refer to the people coming from the land of Roh. Roh was originally a geographical term which corresponded with, in its limited sense, the territory stretching from Swat and Bajaur in the north to Sibi in the south, and from Hasan Abdal (Attock) in the east to Kabul and Kandahar in the west. Roh was the homeland of the Pashtuns, in the southern foothills of the Hindu Kush. Historically, the region of Roh has also been called "Pashtunkhwa" and "Afghanistan". Pashtuns especially the Mandarr Yousafzai tribe living in this valley were also known as Rohillas when they settled the area then known as Katehr. It later became known as Rohilkhand which means the land of the Rohillas. A majority of Rohillas migrated from Pashtunistan to North India between the 17th and 18th century.

History

Early history 

The founder of the state of Rohilkhand was an Indian Muslim convert named Ali Muhammad Khan, the adoptive son of Daud Khan Rohilla. The first immigrant to the Katehr region was Shah Alam Khan, who had settled in Katehr in 1673 and had brought along a band of his tribe, the Barech. His son Daud Khan gained a number of villages in the Katehr region in the then northern India by Mughal emperor Aurangzeb (ruled 1658–1707) to suppress Rajput uprisings, which had afflicted this region. Originally, some 20,000 soldiers from various Pashtun tribes such as (Yusafzai, Ghori, Ghilzai, Barech, Marwat, Durrani, Tareen, Kakar, Naghar, Afridi, Bangash and Khattak) were hired by Mughals to provide mercenary soldier for the Mughal armies. This was appreciated by Aurangzeb and since this force of 25,000 men was given respected positions in the Mughal Army.

Establishment of the Rohilla state
The rise of the Rohilla state owed mainly to Ali Muhammad Khan, who succeeded Daud Khan's jagirs in 1721. Ali Muhammad Khan distinguished himself by helping in suppressing the rebellion of the Barah Sayyids under the chief Saifudddin Barha who had put the Mughal governor Marhamat Khan and all of his followers to death. As a reward Ali Muhammad Khan was given the title of Nawab by Muhammad Shah in 1737. He became so powerful that he refused to send tax revenues to the central government. Safdar Jang, the Nawab of Oudh, warned the Mughal emperor Muhammad Shah of the growing power of the Rohillas. This caused Mohammed Shah to send an expedition against him as a result of which he surrendered to imperial forces. He was taken to Delhi as a prisoner, but was later pardoned and appointed governor of Sirhind. Most of his soldiers has already settled in the Katehar region during Nadir Shah's invasion of northern India in 1739 increasing the Rohilla population in the area to 100,000. Due to the large settlement of Rohilla Pashtuns, this part Katehar region came to be known as Rohilkhand. The conversion of Hindus to Islam further resulted in its rapid growth. Bareilly was made the capital of this newly formed Rohilkhand state.

When Ali Muhammad Khan died, leaving six sons. However, two of his elder sons were in Afghanistan at the time of his death while the other four were too young to assume the leadership of Rohilkhand. As a result, power transferred to other Rohilla Sardars, the most important being Hafiz Rahmat Khan Barech, Najib-ud-Daula and Dundi Khan.

Following the Battle of Panipat in 1761 

In the third battle of Panipat (1761) one of the Rohilla Sardars, Najib-ul-Daula, allied himself with Ahmad Shah Abdali against the Marathas. He not only provided 40,000 Rohilla troops but also 70 guns to the allied. He also convinced Shuja-ul-Daula, the Nawab of Oudh, to join Ahmad Shah Abdali's forces against the Marathas. In this battle, the Marathas were defeated and as a consequence the Rohilla increased in power.

The Marathas invaded Rohilkhand to retaliate against the Rohillas' participation in the Panipat war. The Marathas under the leadership of the Maratha ruler Mahadji Shinde entered the land of Sardar Najib-ud-Daula which was held by his son Zabita Khan after the sardar's death. Zabita Khan initially resisted the attack but was eventually defeated by the Marathas and forced to flee to the camp of Shuja-ud-Daula and his country was ravaged by Marathas. The Maratha ruler Mahadji Shinde captured the family of Zabita Khan, desecrated the grave of Najib ad-Dawlah and looted his fort. The principal remaining Rohilla Sardar was Hafiz Rahmat Khan Barech and through him an agreement was formed with the Nawab of Oudh, Shuja-ud-Daula, by which the Rohillas agreed to pay four million rupees in return for military help against the Marathas. However, after Oudh attacked the Rohillas, they refused to pay.

Afterwards, the Rohillas were attacked by the neighbouring kingdom of Oudh, who also received assistance from an East India Company force under the command of Colonel Alexander Champion. This conflict is known as the Rohilla War. When Hafiz Rahmat Khan Barech was killed, in April 1774, Rohilla resistance crumbled, and Rohilkhand was annexed by the kingdom of Oudh; most Rohillas either emigrated or started a guerrilla war against the annexation. Warren Hastings' role in the conflict was publicized during his impeachment.

From 1774 to 1799, the region was administered by Khwaja Almas Khan, a Meo from Haryana, as representative of the Awadh (Kingdom of Oudh) rulers. This period was particularly tough for the Rohillas, as Almas Khan made every effort to weaken the Rohillas. In 1799, the British East India Company annexed the territory, and started to pay a pension to the family of Hafiz Rahmat Khan Barech.

Establishment of Rampur State 

While most of Rohilkhand was annexed, the Rohilla State of Rampur was established by Nawab Faizullah Khan on 7 October 1774 in the presence of Colonel Alexander Champion, and remained a compliant state under British protection thereafter. The first stone of the new Fort at Rampur was laid in 1775 by Nawab Faizullah Khan. The first Nawab proposed to rename the city Faizabad, but many other places were known by that name so its name was changed to Mustafabad. 

The Qissa-o-Ahwal-i-Rohilla written by Rustam Ali Bijnori in 1776 provides an example of the refined Urdu prose of the Muslim Rohilla elite in Rohilkhand and Katehr.

According to the 1901 census of India, the total Pathan population of Bareilly District was 40,779, while the total population was 1,090,117.

Nawab Faizullah Khan ruled for 20 years. He was a patron of education and began the collection of Arabic, Persian, Turkish and Hindustani manuscripts which are now housed in the Rampur Raza Library. After his death his son Muhammad Ali Khan took over. He was assassinated by Rohilla elders after reigning for 24 days, and Muhammad Ali Khan's brother, Ghulam Muhammad Khan, was proclaimed Nawab. The East India Company took exception to this, and after a reign of just 3 months and 22 days, Ghulam Muhammad Khan was besieged and defeated by East India Company forces. The East India Company supported Muhammad Ali Khan's son, Ahmad Ali Khan, to be the new Nawab. He ruled for 44 years. He did not have any sons, so Muhammad Saeed Khan, son of Ghulam Muhammad Khan, took over as the new Nawab after his death. He established Courts and improved the economic conditions of farmers. His son Muhammad Yusuf Ali Khan took over after his death and his son, Kalb Ali Khan, became the new Nawab after his death in 1865.

Between 1857 and 1947 

The period between the revolt of 1857 and the independence of India in 1947 was a period of stability for the Rohilla community. In 1858, the British colonial government issued a general pardon to all those who had taken part in the Indian Rebellion and restored many lands. Some of the tribes were punished for aiding the rebels. Some tribes had to migrate to Delhi and Gurgaon, while others migrated to the Deccan region. Conditions improved after some years and migration from the North West Frontier Province and Afghanistan recommenced, adding to the Rohilla population. During this period, the Rohillas were also effected by the reformist movement of Sir Syed Ahmed Khan, with many taking to modern education. The founder of the Barelvi sect of Sunni Islam, Ahmad Raza Khan, was also born among the Rohillas and the city of Bareilly became an important centre of Islamic learning in Northern India.

While a majority of Rohillas remained landowners and cultivators, a significant minority took to western education, and entered professions such as law and medicine. They also began to take an interest in the political debates during the last decade of the 19th Century. Some of them joined the newly formed Indian National Congress, while others were attracted to pan-Islamism. This period also saw a wholesale adoption of North Indian Muslim culture, with Urdu becoming the native language of the Rohilla. In fact the term of Rohilla was slowly replaced with the term "Pathan", which was a new self-identification. However a sense of distinct identity remained strong, with the Rohillas residing in distinct quarters of cities, such as, Kakar Tola, Pani Tola and Gali Nawaban in Bareilly, which was home to the descendants of Hafiz Rahmat Khan. There was intermarriages with neighbouring Muslim communities such as the Shaikh, Muslim Rajput and Kamboh. Thus at the dawn of independence, the Rohilla were losing their distinct community status.

Present circumstances 

The independence of Pakistan and India in 1947 had a profound effect on the Rohilla community. The vast majority of them emigrated to Pakistan in 1947. Those that were left in India, were affected by the abolishment of the zamindari system in 1949, as well as the ascension of the State of Rampur to India and many of them migrated to join their kinsmen in Karachi, Pakistan. The Rohilla now form two distinct communities with the majority in Pakistan and a small minority residing in India.

In India 

The Rohilla now form one of the larger Muslim communities of Uttar Pradesh and are found throughout Uttar Pradesh, with settlements in Rampur, Bareilly, Shahjahanpur in Rohilkhand being the densest. 

The Pathan (Rohilla) community of UP has sixteen sub-groups, the Ghilzai, Afridi, Barakzai, Barech, Daudzai, Marwat, Durrani, Bettani, Naghar, Ghorghushti, Sur Pashtun, Kakar, Khalil, Mohmand, Mohammadzai, Orakzai, Yousafzai and Wazir, all of which are descended from well known Pashtun tribes. Some Rohilla Pathans reside in Maharashtra's Washim and Nanded district, Tehsil Kinwat Tribal Area. There is also a small population in Bendi and Kopra, two villages in Kinwat Taluka. In older parts of the Muslim areas of the towns in UP, the Pathans have maintained their own residential neighbourhoods. The Pathan are not an endogamous group, and arranged marriages do occur with other Sunni Muslim communities of similar social status, such as the Mughal tribe, Muslim Rajput and Shaikh although there is still a preference of marriage within the community.

The Rohilla have historically been landowners and soldiers, therefore, some parts of the community are associated with agriculture in Rohilkhand, while many Rohilla officers who worked in the British Indian Army in the 1940s migrated to Pakistan and joined the Pakistani Army; famous among them are General Rahimuddin Khan and General Akhtar Abdur Rahman. They have also been prominent in the Muslim religious sphere in UP, having produced many alims and Huffaz and have built and financed many Mosques and Madrasahs. In terms of formal education, they are seen as a community that has a favourable attitude towards western education, and many are professional doctors and lawyers.

In Pakistan 

In Pakistan, the Rohillas and other Urdu-speaking Pathans have now completely assimilated into larger Urdu speaking community. There is no sense of corporate identity among the descendants of Rohilla Pathans in Pakistan with high degree of intermarriage with other Muslims. They mainly live in Karachi, Hyderabad, Sukkur, and other urban areas of Sindh. Many have held high positions in the government, notably Sahibzada Yaqub Khan, a Rohilla, who was Pakistan's Minister of Foreign Affairs during the 1980s.

In Afghanistan 
The Afghan president, Mohammed Daud Khan and former King Zahir Shah were Rohilla Pathans.

See also
Pashtun diaspora
Pathans of Bihar
Pathans of Uttar Pradesh
Pathans of Punjab
Pathans of Sindh 
Pathans of Gujarat

References

Further reading 
 Gulistán-I Rahmat of Nawáb Mustajáb Khán.
 Hastings and the Rohilla War by John Strachey. Author(s) of Review: Sidney James Owen The English Historical Review, Vol. 8, No. 30 (Apr., 1893), pp. 373–380

 
Mughal Empire
Maratha Empire
History of Uttar Pradesh
Social groups of Pakistan
Punjabi tribes
Indian people of Pashtun descent
Muslim communities of India
Social groups of Uttar Pradesh
Muslim communities of Uttar Pradesh
Rohilla